Charles Cadwell, was a professor at the Case School of Applied Science (now Case Western Reserve University), in Cleveland, Ohio.

He further developed the exothermic welding system previously invented by Hans Goldschmidt in 1895; in 1938-1939 Cadwell developed a non-ferrous exothermic welding process using copper, today widely known as "Cadweld". The original use of the process was to weld signal bonds to railroad tracks, which previously had to be done with "pins" knocked into holes drilled into the web of the rail.
Later developments allows the rails themselves to be welded together.

See also 
 Rail profile

References 

Case Western Reserve University faculty
Rail technologies
Welding
Year of birth missing
Year of death missing